New Lisbon Airport  (Portuguese: Novo Aeroporto de Lisboa, NAL) is the currently planned site for construction of a new Lisbon Airport to serve the Center and South of Portugal, scheduled to complement the current Portela Airport as Lisbon's main airport

History
After years of debate and public consultation whether Rio Frio or Ota would be the place to build a new Lisbon airport, a new location was proposed in Alcochete and won as it was more accessible given the good infrastructure nearby, such as the Vasco da Gama Bridge. The location of Alcochete as the construction site of the future Lisbon Airport was confirmed by the Portuguese Government on 8 May 2008. The estimated cost for the project is €3 billion (approximately US$4.5 billion). Construction started in late 2010 but, in May 2010, forced by the financial crisis, Prime Minister José Sócrates put the project on hold.

The green field facility envisaged in the 2000s was to have four runways, and was expected to service over 50 million passengers annually.

After the termination of the new airport project, a plan was later put forward to keep the existing airport in service, but also convert the preexisting Naval Air Base in Montijo into a facility for low cost carriers.

In November 2018, at an IATA congress in Madrid, Pedro Marques, Minister of Planning and Infrastructure, stated that Montijo airport would start operating by 2022. French construction group Vinci, which owns ANA Aeroportos de Portugal, said in 2019 it would invest 1.15 billion euros ($1.39 billion) in the expansion of Lisbon's main airport and the construction of the new one. On 31 October 2019, the IATA declared that operations for low cost airlines would begin in 2021.

In March 2021, Portugal's aviation regulator ANAC rejected the evaluation request submitted by ANA, citing disagreements with the municipalities in and around the new airport as well as environmental concerns.

As of 2019, the conversion of Montijo Airforce Base into a civilian airport for low-cost airlines is targeted to be completed around December 2022.

References

Airports in Portugal
Proposed airports
Proposed transport infrastructure in Portugal